Seventeen Seventy Five is a 1992 pilot episode for a CBS situation comedy. Set in colonial Philadelphia during the run-up to the American Revolution, the series was to follow the exploits of innkeeper Jeremy Proctor and his family. The series was not picked up by CBS, but was broadcast as a special presentation once September 5, 1992.

A similar idea for a situation comedy was mentioned by Andrew Alexander in a commentary track for SCTV.

Plot
Innkeeper Jeremy Proctor needs funds to send his daughters to a ball (which will hopefully lead to marrying one of them off). He thus tries to borrow the money from his brother-in-law, George Washington, but to no avail.

Cast
Ryan O'Neal - Jeremy Proctor
Lesley-Anne Down - Annabelle Proctor
Sarah Koskoff - Maude Proctor
Judith Jones - Eliza Proctor
Danielle Harris - Abby Proctor
Gregory Sporleder - Bert
Adam West - George Washington
Jeffrey Tambor - Governor Massengill

References

External links

1992 American television episodes
1992 in American television
Television episodes set in Philadelphia
Television pilots not picked up as a series